Dag Riisnæs (born 20 June 1969) is a Norwegian former footballer who played as a midfielder. He made six appearances for the Norway national team from 1989 to 1991.

References

External links
 

1969 births
Living people
Norwegian footballers
Association football midfielders
Norway international footballers
Norway youth international footballers
Norway under-21 international footballers
Eliteserien players
Kongsvinger IL Toppfotball players
Vålerenga Fotball players
Place of birth missing (living people)